Kenneth Marshall Adamson (born October 12, 1938) was an American college and professional football player. An offensive guard, he played college football at the University of Notre Dame, and played professionally in the American Football League for the Denver Broncos from 1960 through 1962. He was an AFL All-Star in 1961.

References

See also

List of American Football League players

American Football League All-Star players
1938 births
Living people
Denver Broncos (AFL) players
American football offensive guards
Notre Dame Fighting Irish football players
Players of American football from Phoenix, Arizona